Chris Tracz (born March 24, 1982) is an American baseball coach and former pitcher, who is the current head baseball coach of the Army Black Knights. He played college baseball for Marist from 2001 to 2005. He served as the head coach of the Marist Red Foxes (2010–2022).

Playing career
Tracz was a pitcher for Marist from 2001 to 2005, helping the Red Foxes to reach three NCAA Tournaments and serving as a captain for his final three seasons. In 2002 and 2003, he played collegiate summer baseball with the Falmouth Commodores of the Cape Cod Baseball League.

Coaching career
Tracz began his coaching career as an assistant with the Red Foxes, serving as pitching coach and recruiting coordinator.  He spent one season as an assistant with Army before returning to Marist as head coach.

In July 2011, Tracz was inducted into the North Branford High School Hall of Fame.

In June 2016, Tracz was named to the MAAC 35th anniversary team for spring sports.

In 2017, Tracz guided Marist to win their first Metro Atlantic Athletic Conference Baseball Championship since 2009. This Team received the #4 seed in the Gainesville Regional to represent the MAAC in the 2017 NCAA Division I baseball tournament.

On July 27, 2022, Tracz was named the head coach at Army.

Head coaching record
This table depicts Tracz's record as a head coach.

See also
List of current NCAA Division I baseball coaches

References

Living people
Baseball pitchers
People from North Branford, Connecticut
Army Black Knights baseball coaches
Marist Red Foxes baseball players
Falmouth Commodores players
Marist Red Foxes baseball coaches
1982 births